Mystery Vortex is an annual professional wrestling event produced by Pro Wrestling Guerrilla (PWG). The event is titled as such because most of the matches are not announced beforehand to captivate the audiences with surprise matches. The event is notable for unannounced returns of major PWG wrestlers, surprise debuts of major stars and matches often being announced during the event.

Dates, venues and main events
<onlyinclude>

Results

Mystery Vortex I

One of the PWG's six co-founders and the promotion's veteran Joey Ryan wrestled his farewell match in the promotion against Scorpio Sky due to signing a contract with Total Nonstop Action Wrestling. Ryan lost the match.

Mystery Vortex II

Mystery Vortex III

Josh Alexander competed in his farewell match at the event as he retired from wrestling due to neck injury. Monster Mafia lost to World's Cutest Tag Team in Alexander's farewell match. The event featured the surprise return of The Young Bucks after a four-month absence, who interrupted Andrew Everett and Trevor Lee to an impromptu match and defeated them to win the PWG World Tag Team Championship, thanks to interference by the PWG World Champion Roderick Strong. After the match, Super Dragon made his surprise return to PWG after a three-year absence and attacked Rick Knox, Excalibur, Candice LeRae, Andrew Everett, Trevor Lee, Biff Busick and Mike Bailey in quick succession. Strong subsequently formed the Mount Rushmore 2.0 faction with Dragon and the Bucks.

Mystery Vortex IV

Chris Hero wrestled his farewell match in PWG at the event, in which Death By Elbow lost to reDRagon. Hero cut a promo after the match, in which he explained his departure due to re-signing with WWE.

Mystery Vortex V

Ricochet's PWG World Championship title defense against Chuck Taylor in a Guerrilla Warfare was his farewell match. He cut a promo after losing the title.

Mystery Vortex VI

Mystery Vortex 7

Super Dragon made his surprise return to the promotion by joining Black Taurus and Demonic Flamita in assaulting Bandido after Bandido retained the PWG World Championship against Taurus. This prompted AEW star Malakai Black, who formerly competed in PWG as Tommy End, to make his surprise return to the promotion after a five-year absence, having last competed at the 2016 Battle of Los Angeles. Black rescued Bandido from the assault and was joined by Brody King and the two formed a tag team with Black promising to appear at Threemendous VI.

References

External links
Pro Wrestling Guerrilla official website

Professional wrestling in Los Angeles
Recurring events established in 2012
Pro Wrestling Guerrilla events
Professional wrestling in California